or  (English: Bertha), also commonly known as  and other variations, was once known as a goddess in Alpine paganism in the Upper German and Austrian regions of the Alps. Her name may mean "the bright one" (from Proto-Germanic *berhtaz) and is probably related to the name , meaning the feast of the Epiphany. Eugen Mogk provides an alternative etymology, attributing the origin of the name  to the Old High German verb , meaning "hidden" or "covered".

Perchta is often identified as stemming from the same Germanic goddess  as Holda and other female figures of Germanic folklore (see Frija-Frigg). According to Jacob Grimm and Lotte Motz, Perchta is Holda's southern cousin or equivalent, as they both share the role of "guardian of the beasts" and appear during the Twelve Days of Christmas, when they oversee spinning.

Grimm says Perchta or Berchta was known "precisely in those Upper German regions where Holda leaves off, in Swabia, in Alsace, in Switzerland, in Bavaria and Austria."

According to Erika Timm, Perchta emerged from an amalgamation of Germanic and pre-Germanic, probably Celtic, traditions of the Alpine regions after the Migration Period in the Early Middle Ages.

Names of Perchta 
Perchta had many different names depending on the era and region: Grimm listed the names Perahta and Berchte as the main names (in his heading), followed by Berchta in Old High German, as well as Behrta and Frau Perchta. In Baden, Swabia, Switzerland and Slovenian regions, she was often called Frau Faste (the lady of the Ember days) or Pehta or 'Kvaternica', in Slovene. Elsewhere she was known as Posterli, Quatemberca and Fronfastenweiber.

The mother of the Franks emperor Charlemagne may have had a related albeit unwitted influence, as it did the Visigoth queen Brunhilda on her own, into its medieval folklore, Bertha or Berthrada was said to be of long and wide feet, in effect taller than her husband called precisely, Pippin the Short and may have been the reason why Charlemagne inherited from her his unusual height.

In southern Austria, in Carinthia among the Slovenes, a male form of Perchta was known as Quantembermann, in German, or Kvaternik, in Slovene (the man of the four Ember days). Grimm thought that her male counterpart or equivalent is Berchtold.

Regional variations of the name include Berigl, Berchtlmuada, Perhta-Baba, Zlobna Pehta, Bechtrababa, Sampa, Stampa, Lutzl, Zamperin, Pudelfrau, Zampermuatta and Rauweib.

Description 
In some descriptions, Perchta has two forms; she may appear either as beautiful and white as snow like her name, or as elderly and haggard.

In many old descriptions, Perchta had one large foot, sometimes called a goose foot or swan foot. Grimm thought the strange foot symbolized her being a higher being who could shapeshift to animal form. He noticed that Bertha with a strange foot exists in many languages (Middle German "Berhte mit dem fuoze", French "Berthe au grand pied", Latin "Berhta cum magno pede", Italian " Berta dai gran piè", title of a medieval epic poem of Italian area): "It is apparently a swan maiden's foot, which as a mark of her higher nature she cannot lay aside...and at the same time the spinning-woman's splayfoot that worked the treadle".

In the Tyrol she appears as little old woman with a very wrinkled face, bright lively eyes, and a long hooked nose; her hair is disheveled, her garments tattered and torn.

Traditional narratives 
Initially, Perchta was the upholder of cultural taboos, such as the prohibition against spinning on holidays. In the folklore of Bavaria and Austria, Perchta was said to roam the countryside at midwinter, and to enter homes during the twelve days between Christmas and Epiphany (especially on the Twelfth Night). She would know whether the children and young servants of the household had behaved well and worked hard all year. If they had, they might find a small silver coin the next day, in a shoe or pail. If they had not, she would slit their bellies open, remove their stomach and guts, and stuff the hole with straw and pebbles.  She was particularly concerned to see that girls had spun the whole of their allotted portion of flax or wool during the year. She would also slit people's bellies open and stuff them with straw if they ate something on the night of her feast day, other than the traditional meal of fish and gruel.

The cult of Perchta, under which followers left food and drink for Fraw Percht and her followers in the hope of receiving wealth and abundance, was condemned in Bavaria in the Thesaurus pauperum (1468) and by Thomas Ebendorfer von Haselbach in De decem praeceptis (1439).

Later canonical and church documents characterized Perchta as synonymous with other leading female spirits: Holda, Diana, Herodias, Richella and Abundia.

Related beings 

Grimm thought Holda is her equivalent while the  may derive directly from Berchta in her white form.

These come during the Twelve Nights and festivals to "bring luck and wealth to the people." Men dressed as the ugly Perchten during the 16th century and went from house to house driving out bad spirits.

Interpretations 
According to Jacob Grimm (1882), Perchta was spoken of in Old High German in the 10th century as Frau Berchta and thought to be a white-robed goddess who oversaw spinning and weaving, like the myths of Holda.  He believed she was the feminine equivalent of Berchtold, and was sometimes the leader of the Wild Hunt. However, John B. Smith disagrees and suggests that Perchta represents the personification of the feast of the Epiphany (Perchta's Day), and is therefore not pre-Christian.

Modern celebrations 
In contemporary culture, Perchta is portrayed as a "rewarder of the generous, and the punisher of the bad, particularly lying children".
  
Today in Austria, particularly Salzburg, where she is said to wander through Hohensalzburg Castle in the dead of night, the Perchten are still a traditional part of holidays and festivals (such as the Carnival Fastnacht). The wooden animal masks made for the festivals are today called .

Beautiful masks are said to encouraging financial windfalls, and the ugly masks are worn to drive away evil spirits.

A number of large ski-resorts have turned the tradition into a tourist attraction drawing large crowds every winter.

See also 
 
 Baba Yaga
 Befana
 Frau Holle
 Krampus
 Oliebol
 Pre-Christian Alpine traditions
 Spillaholle
 Swabian-Alemannic-Fastnacht
 Weiße Frauen
 Wild Hunt

References

Bibliography

Sources 
Frazer, Sir James George. 1920. The Golden Bough. A Study in Magic and Religion. IX. Part 6. "The Scapegoat", pages 240–243. Macmillan & Co. (Facsimili Elibron Classics, 2005) . (Online). File retrieved May 18, 2007.
Mogk, Eugen. 1907. Germanische Mythologie 
Müller, Felix and Ulrich. 1999. "Percht und Krampus, Kramperl und Schiach-Perchten." Wunderlich, Werner (Ed.): Mittelalter-Mythen 2. Dämonen-Monster-Fabelwesen. St. Gallen, S. 449–460. (Online, German) File retrieved May 18, 2007.
Timm, Erika. 2003. Frau Holle, Frau Percht und verwandte Gestalten: 160 Jahre nach Grimm aus germanistischer Sicht betrachtet.
Wagner, Alexander.  2007. Perchtenläufe: Salzburg's Pagan Heritage. (Online) File retrieved May 18, 2007.
Waschnitius, Viktor. 1913. Perht, Holda und verwandte Gestalten: ein Beitrag zur deutschen Religionsgeschichte. Sitzungsberichte der Akademie der Wissenschaften in Wien, Philosophisch-Historische Klasse.

Further reading

 
  Accessed 30 Dec. 2022.
 
  Accessed 30 Dec. 2022.

External links 
 

Alpine folklore
Bavarian folklore
German legendary creatures
Swiss folklore
Alemanni
Christmas characters
Germanic goddesses
Slovene mythology
Slavic legendary creatures
Textiles in folklore
Female legendary creatures
Supernatural legends
Masks in Europe
Ritual masks
Slavic folklore characters